Kovur is a town western part of Chennai City in the Kanchipuram district of the Indian state of Tamil Nadu. The town is a suburb of Chennai Metropolitan Area and is situated at a distance of about 5 kilometer's from Porur Chennai on the Porur-Kundrathur road.

Demographics 

According to the 2001 census, Kovur had a population of 5,948 with 3,004 males and 2,944 females. The sex ratio was 948 and the literacy rate, 84.48.

References

Villages in Kanchipuram district